Dorothea of Saxony (4 October 1563 in Dresden – 13 February 1587 in Wolfenbüttel) was a Saxon princess from the House of Wettin and by marriage Duchess of Brunswick-Wolfenbüttel.

Life 
Dorothea was born 4 October 1563, the daughter of the Elector Augustus of Saxony (1526–1586) and his wife Anna (1532–1585), daughter of King Christian III of Denmark.  Of the four 15 children from the marriage of her parents, only four survived their father; Dorothea among them.

On 26 September 1585 in Wolfenbüttel, the twenty-two-year-old Dorothea married the future Duke Henry Julius of Brunswick-Wolfenbüttel (1564–1613), who was one year her junior.  At the time, her mother Anna was seriously ill and Dorothea had felt very badly and cried pitifully when she said farewell.

The marriage would consolidate a Protestant alliance of German princes, led by Count Palatine John Casimir of Simmern, who had married Dorothea's sister Elizabeth in 1570. Unfortunately, the marriage would be short-lived as Dorothea would die in childbirth aged 23 on 13 February 1587.

Henry remarried a few years later on 19 April 1590. By his second wife, Elizabeth of Denmark, Henry had ten more children, one of whom was named Dorothea.

Issue 
From her marriage to Henry Julius Dorothea had one daughter:
 Dorothea Hedwig (1587–1609)
 married in 1605 Rudolf of Anhalt-Zerbst (1576–1621)

Ancestors

References and sources 
 Wilhelm Havemann: Geschichte der Lande Braunschweig und Lüneburg, 
 Günter Meißner: Saur allgemeines Künstlerlexikon, K.G. Saur Verlag, p. 508
 Jörg Jochen Berns: Höfische Festkultur in Braunschweig-Wolfenbüttel, 1590-1666: Vorträge eines ..:, p. 421
 Karl August Muffat: Die Verhandlungen der protestantischen Fürsten in den Jahren 1590 und 1591 ...'', p. 5

Footnotes 

Nobility from Dresden
House of Wettin
1563 births
1587 deaths
German duchesses
16th-century German people
Albertine branch
Deaths in childbirth
Daughters of monarchs